Qasr Abu Hadi is a village with an estimated 4,890 inhabitants in the Sirte District of Libya. It is 2 km east of the Gardabya Airport and 20 km south of Sirte.

Former Libyan leader Muammar Gaddafi claimed to have been born in a goat-hair tent near the village on 7 June 1942.

References

Muammar Gaddafi
Populated places in Sirte District
Villages in Libya